The Robert Schumann Hochschule (Robert Schumann University of Music and Media) is a school for music studies at the university level located in Düsseldorf. The University has a student body of some 850 coming from over 40 countries.
Forty-seven full-time and part-time faculty and 200 associate professors (People) provide individualized instruction.

History 
In 1935 three private music schools were merged into the Robert Schumann Conservatorium, named after the composer Robert Schumann, who lived in Düsseldorf for some years.

In 1972 the state of North Rhine-Westphalia became the body responsible for the music college. It became part of the public college for music in the Rhineland. In 1987 it became an independent college and was given its current name.

Studies 
The programs of study offered by the Robert Schumann Hochschule cover the entire range of music professions. Music, the largest of the programs of study, focuses on performance: Anyone who studies piano or violin, guitar or clarinet, composition or voice in Düsseldorf learns to perform together with other musicians in orchestras and ensembles. That is why degree programs include many performance opportunities: The University Orchestra regularly performs at Düsseldorf's Tonhalle symphony hall and, in close collaboration with the Deutsche Oper am Rhein, opera voice majors show off their talent in an annual staged opera production.

The Musikvermittlung (Music Promotion) degree program includes majors in Music Education, Conducting, Ear Training, and Church Music. Social and pedagogical competency play an important role in all majors. For instance, a church music major not only has to play the organ but also be able to lead a choir and to make music with children and young people. Work with laypeople is also the goal of the music education degree program, where education majors are prepared for a career as teachers in music schools.

Despite the considerable amount of work on performance, theory is not neglected. The musicology faculty carry on research in historical and systematic musicology. They organize scientific symposia and publish a series of scholarly papers. A special role is played by the Institute of Music and Media which concentrates on the practical training of students for careers in media and the music industry. Majors such as Media Composition, Music and Media, Media Dramaturgy and Management provide excellent training for work in these specialized fields. The program of studies Audio and Video, offered in cooperation with the University of Applied Sciences Düsseldorf, combines studies in engineering with formal conservatory training. Düsseldorf is the only university to offer this major in Germany.

Cooperation with the German Armed Forces Music Training corps, which began in 1976, is also unique. Every professional musician in Germany's armed forces has a degree from the Robert Schumann Hochschule. The Bundeswehr prepares soldiers for the entrance exam and later employs the trained musicians.

The Rometsch-Competition 
The Rometsch-Wettbewerb (Rometsch-Competition) is an internal competition for soloists and chamber music. The competition is highly regarded in the classical music world and awards a cumulative 9.000 Euro prize.

Notable teachers

Notable students

See also
Robert Schumann

External links
 
 Institut für Musik und Medien
 Robert-Schumann-Hochschule Düsseldorf, Video 2015

Robert Schumann Hochschule
Music in Düsseldorf
Culture in Düsseldorf
Education in Düsseldorf
Hochschule
Universities and colleges in North Rhine-Westphalia